The AC Hotel Portland Downtown is a 204-room hotel operated by Marriott International in Portland, Oregon. Located at the intersection of Southwest 3rd Avenue and Taylor Street, the 13-floor hotel opened in 2017. The hotel has a bar called AC Lounge.

References

External links

 

2017 establishments in Oregon
Hotel buildings completed in 2017
Hotels in Portland, Oregon
Marriott International
Southwest Portland, Oregon